Shark River Reef is an artificial reef located in the Atlantic Ocean, 15.6 miles southeast of Manasquan Inlet, off of the coast of Ocean County, New Jersey. The site contains almost 4 million cubic yards of dredge rock material. Although 96% of the total reef material is rock, the site also contains numerous subway cars.

It is the deepest of all New Jersey's artificial reefs, having an average bottom depth of approximately 125'. The site is located near Stolt Dagali wreck (rammed and sunk in 1964 by the SS Shalom).

The site contains at least nine vessels, including five tankers.

The Shark River Reef was established as part of the New Jersey's Artificial Reef Program. It is administered by the State of New Jersey's Division of Fish and Wildlife.

Boundaries
Coordinates are as follows:

Incidents
On two occasions, rocks intended for the Shark River Reef were dumped before reaching the site, violating the Marine Protection, Research and Sanctuaries Act (MPRSA), known as the Ocean Dumping Act.

The first incident occurred in December 2003 in rough seas. 3,600 cubic yards of rock shifted position within the barge, causing it to flip over and dump its cargo.

The second incident, also in December, resulted in the deliberate dumping of 3,600 cubic yards of dredged rock material about half of a mile north of the reef. Due to a punctured hull, the barge carrying the rock began to lean rapidly. To avoid possible sinking or flipping of the barge, the captain dumped the rock.

See also

References

Reference for coordinates

External links
Exact coordinates for submerged objects
Itemized list and images of vehicles sunk at Shark River Reef
Images, list of ships at site, map of features

Artificial reefs
Reefs of the Atlantic Ocean
Landforms of Ocean County, New Jersey
Ecosystems
Reefs of the United States
Landforms of New Jersey